Parapalaeosepsis is a genus of flies in the family Sepsidae.

Species
Parapalaeosepsis apicalis (Meijere, 1906)
Parapalaeosepsis basifera (Walker, 1859)
Parapalaeosepsis compressa Zuska, 1970
Parapalaeosepsis laffooni Steyskal, 1949
Parapalaeosepsis limbata (Meijere, 1906)
Parapalaeosepsis mesopla Steyskal, 1949
Parapalaeosepsis plebeia (Meijere, 1906)
Parapalaeosepsis ploskolapka Ozerov, 2004
''Parapalaeosepsis spatulata Zuska, 1970

References

Sepsidae
Diptera of Australasia
Taxa named by Oswald Duda
Brachycera genera